Lochgilphead Football Club was a Scottish association football club based in the town of Lochgilphead, Argyll. The club was founded in 1887 and disbanded in 1893. The club competed in the Scottish Cup for four seasons between 1887 and 1890. The club's home colours were blue and white vertical striped shirts with navy blue shorts.

References 

Defunct football clubs in Scotland
Association football clubs established in 1887
1887 establishments in Scotland
Association football clubs disestablished in 1893
1893 disestablishments in Scotland
Football in Argyll and Bute
Lochgilphead